Natalia Esperón (born Natalia del Carmen Esperón Alcocer; November 14, 1974) is a Mexican actress and former model.

Personal life
In 1995, Esperón married José Bastón; the next year she gave birth to daughter Natalia. In 2003 she gave birth to triplets: daughter Mariana and sons Jose Antonio and Sebastian. Sebastian died a few days after birth. In 2005, Esperon divorced Baston.

Filmography

Awards and nominations

TVyNovelas Awards

Premios El Heraldo de México

Diosas de Plata

References

External links

 Biography of Natalia Esperón on esmas

1974 births
Living people
Mexican telenovela actresses
Mexican television actresses
Mexican film actresses
Mexican female models
20th-century Mexican actresses
21st-century Mexican actresses
Actresses from Mexico City
People from Mexico City